Edward Mellish  (b Blyth, Nottinghamshire 21 June 1766 – d Tuddenham 11 December 1830) was an Anglican priest in the late 18th and early 19th centuries.

Mellish was educated at Eton College and Trinity College, Cambridge.
 He held livings at Tuddenham, Honingham and Reymerston. He was Dean of Hereford from 1827 until his death.

His grandson was a notable British diplomat.

Notes

1766 births
1830 deaths
People from Nottinghamshire
People educated at Eton College
Alumni of Trinity College, Cambridge
Church of England deans
Deans of Hereford